Mycetophila elegans is a species of  'fungus gnats' in the family Mycetophilidae.

See also 
 List of Mycetophila species

References

External links 

Mycetophilidae
Insects described in 1927